Bryan Soumaré (born 11 February 1999) is a French professional footballer who plays as a midfielder for Ligue 2 club Dijon.

References

Living people
1999 births
People from Saint-Quentin, Aisne
French footballers
Association football midfielders
Olympique Saint-Quentin players
Dijon FCO players
FC Sochaux-Montbéliard players
Championnat National 3 players
Ligue 1 players
Ligue 2 players
Sportspeople from Aisne
Footballers from Hauts-de-France